Val McLane (born Valerie Bradford; 25 February 1943, in Newcastle upon Tyne, Northumberland) is an English actress, scriptwriter, director and teacher. Her younger brother is actor and musician Jimmy Nail.

McLane founded the Live Theatre Company in Newcastle in 1973 with director Geoff Gillham. She has appeared in numerous television roles, including When the Boat Comes In, Behind the Bike Sheds, and some Catherine Cookson adaptations for Tyne Tees Television. She appeared as Norma, Dennis' (Tim Healy) sister in the second series of Auf Wiedersehen, Pet. In real life, Val is fellow AWP star Jimmy Nail's sister. Other television roles include a role as a secretary in Our Friends in the North.

Stage roles include Florrie in Andy Capp: The Musical at the Aldwych Theatre. She usually appears in the biannual benefit concert Sunday for Sammy. She appeared in the films Wish You Were Here and Purely Belter. She also appeared in Jane Eyre 1997 and Grace Poole.

She has edited The Prison Plays by Tom Hadaway and released Women in My Past: A Dramatic Monologue, an audio book of dramatic monologue in prose, poetry and song. She was drama leader at the University of Sunderland until retiring in 2008. She now teaches the BA Honours Bridging Course at Reid Kerr College on behalf of University of Sunderland.

References

External links

1943 births
Living people
Academics of the University of Sunderland
English dramatists and playwrights
English film actresses
English television actresses
Actresses from Newcastle upon Tyne
People associated with the University of Sunderland